The 1945–46 Cornell Big Red men's ice hockey season was the 39th season of play for the program. The teams was coached by Nick Bawlf in his 24th season.

Season
Cornell opened its first post-war season with a rematch against Yale. The Elis had handled the Big Red in last season's finale and the Cornellians were looking to even the score. Unfortunately, the Big Red were only able to get in 4 days worth of practice prior to the game while Yale had been on the ice for over a month. The Bulldogs embarrassed Cornell in the game, building a 10–2 lead in the first two periods and then tacking on another 8 markers before time was called. It was the second-worst defeat in the history of the program but the team was able to rebound when they played their second game a week later. The team allowed 6 goals in the opening period but seemed to settle down afterwards. Though they lost to the Cadets, the score was much closer at 4–9.

The team returned to Ithaca for their only home game of the year, facing Colgate in the first of a weekend home-and-home series. From the start of the game, Cornell pressed their opponents and hemmed the Red Raiders in their own zone until finally score near the end of the first period. Colgate replied with a strong second frame and tied the score. Bruce Care scored the final goal in the third and earned Cornell its first win in over two years. The effort required to win the match seemed take everything the Big Red had to offer because two night later, Cornell fell to the same Colgate squad 1–9. 

The team did not name a captain for the season.

Roster

Standings

Schedule and results

|-
!colspan=12 style=";" | Regular Season

References

Cornell Big Red men's ice hockey seasons
Cornell
Cornell
Cornell
Cornell